Buprestidae is a family of beetles known as jewel beetles or metallic wood-boring beetles because of their glossy iridescent colors. Larvae of this family are known as flatheaded borers. The family is among the largest of the beetles, with some 15,500 species known in 775 genera. In addition, almost 100 fossil species have been described.

The larger and more spectacularly colored jewel beetles are highly prized by insect collectors. The elytra of some Buprestidae species have been traditionally used in beetlewing jewellery and decoration in certain countries in Asia, like India, Thailand and Japan.

Description and ecology
Catoxantha, Chrysaspis, Euchroma and Megaloxantha contain the largest species. A variety of bright colors are known, often in complicated patterns. The iridescence common to these beetles is not due to pigments in the exoskeleton, but instead is caused by structural coloration, in which microscopic texture in their cuticle selectively reflects specific frequencies of light in particular directions. This is the same effect that makes a compact disc reflect multiple colors.

The larvae bore through roots, logs, stems, and leaves of various types of plants, ranging from trees to grasses. The wood boring types generally favor dying or dead branches on otherwise-healthy trees, while a few types attack green wood; some of these are serious pests capable of killing trees and causing major economic damage, such as the invasive emerald ash borer. Some species are attracted to recently burned forests to lay their eggs. They can sense pine wood smoke from up to 50 miles away, and can see infrared light, helping them to zero in as they get closer to a forest fire.

Ten species of flatheaded borers of the family Buprestidae feed on spruce and fir, but hemlock is their preferred food source (Rose and Lindquist 1985). As with roundheaded borers, most feeding occurs in dying or dead trees, or close to injuries on living trees. Damage becomes abundant only where a continuing supply of breeding material is available. The life history of these borers is similar to that of the roundheaded borers, but some exceedingly long life cycles have been reported under adverse conditions. Full-grown larvae, up to 25 mm long, are characteristically flattened, the anterior part of the body being much broader than the rest. The bronzed adults are usually seen only where suitable material occurs in sunny locations.

Systematics
Jewel beetle classification is not yet robustly established, although there appear to be five or six main lineages, which may be considered subfamilies, possibly with one or two being raised to families in their own right. Some other systems define up to 14 subfamilies.

Subfamilies and selected Genera
The commonly accepted subfamilies, with some representative genera, are:

Agrilinae – cosmopolitan, with most taxa occurring in the Northern Hemisphere
 Agrilus Curtis, 1825  
 Anodontodora Obenberger, 1931
 Asymades Kerremans, 1893
 Brachys Dejean, 1833 
 Chalcophlocteis Obenberger, 1924
 Discoderoides Théry, 1936
 Entomogaster Saunders, 1871
 Ethiopoeus Bellamy, 2008
 Madecorformica Bellamy, 2008
 Meliboeus Deyrolle, 1864 
 Pachyschelus Solier, 1833
 Paracylindromorphus Thery, 1930 
 Paradorella Obenberger, 1923
 Pseudokerremansia Bellamy & Holm, 1985 
 Strandietta Obenberger, 1931
†Burmagrilus Jiang et al. 2021 Burmese amber, Myanmar, Cenomanian
Buprestinae – cosmopolitan
 Agrilozodes Thery, 1927
 Anthaxia Eschscholtz, 1829 
 Bubastoides
 Buprestis
 Calodema – found only in Australia and New Guinea; usually in rain forests
 Castiarina – about 500 species, found only in Australia and New Guinea, previously considered a subgenus of Stigmodera
 Chrysobothris
 Colobogaster
 Conognatha
 Eurythyrea
 Hiperantha
 Metaxymorpha – found only in Australia, New Guinea, and Indonesia; usually in rain forests
 Stigmodera – 7 species remain here 
 Temognatha – About 83-85 species, found only in Australia and New Guinea, previously considered a subgenus of Stigmodera

Chrysochroinae
 Capnodis
 Chalcophora
 Chrysochroa
 Chrysodema Laporte & Gory, 1835 (= Cyalithoides)
 Euchroma
 Halecia
 Lampetis Dejean, 1833 – sometimes included in the tribe Psilopterini, but actually not very close to Psiloptera (tentatively placed here)
 Lampropepla

 Perotis
 Psiloptera (tentatively placed here)
Galbellinae
 Galbella
Julodinae
 Aaata
 Amblysterna
 Julodella
 Julodis

 Neojulodis
 Sternocera

Polycestinae
 Acmaeodera

References

Further reading
  (2002): Buprestidae. In: : American Beetles (Volume 2). CRC Press.
Akiyama, K. and S. Ohmomo. 2000. The Buprestid Beetles of the World. Iconographic Series of Insects 4. . A 341-page work with 120 colour plates.

External links

 Jewel beetle site, with extensive lists of species and many photos
 Flickr Images
 ZinRus Impressive photos.
 Jewel beetles depicted on postage stamps
 Jewel beetles can hear fires, short summary of a JEB-Paper
 Jewel Beetle High Resolution Photography

Archived links
 The World of Jewel Beetles (Buprestidae Home Page)
 Jewel beetles of Prague, with pictures
 Bibliography
 Taiwanese Site Images Binomial Names
 Images of types at NHM(London)
 Hampshire Museum - Beetles in jewelry

 
Polyphaga families
Woodboring beetles
Taxa named by William Elford Leach